Afsdik,  Aafsdiq,    is a village in the  Koura District of Lebanon.

It has a mixed Greek Orthodox and   Sunni Muslim population.

References

External links
 Aafsdiq,  Localiban

Eastern Orthodox Christian communities in Lebanon
Sunni Muslim communities in Lebanon
Populated places in the North Governorate
Koura District